Kirby Muxloe railway station was a station on the Midland Railway line between  and  that bypassed part of the Leicester and Swannington Railway in Leicestershire, England.

The Midland opened line through Kirby Muxloe in 1849, though Kirby Muxloe station did not open until 1859.

British Railways closed Kirby Muxloe station in 1964. It was one of numerous railway stations closed at that time that Flanders and Swann included in their song Slow Train released that year.

In the 1990s BR planned to restore passenger services between Leicester and Burton as the second phase of its Ivanhoe Line project. However, after the privatisation of British Rail in 1995 this phase of the project was discontinued. In 2009 the Association of Train Operating Companies published a £49 million proposal (Connecting Communities: Expanding Access to the Rail Network) to restore passenger services to the line that would include reopening a station at Kirby Muxloe.

References

External links
http://www.disused-stations.org.uk/

Former Midland Railway stations
Disused railway stations in Leicestershire
Railway stations in Great Britain opened in 1848
Railway stations in Great Britain closed in 1964
Beeching closures in England
Proposed railway stations in England